Castiarina crenata is a species of beetle in the Buprestidae family, which is endemic to Australia and widespread in the southern half.

References

crenata
Beetles described in 1805